Royal Air Force Station Lissett or more simply RAF Lissett is a former Royal Air Force station located  south west of Bridlington, East Riding of Yorkshire, England.

History
Originally required as satellite airfield for RAF Catfoss the land was requisitioned in 1940. Although constrained by three roads and the Gransmoor Drain the builders constructed a standard three-runway bomber airfield. It had two hangars and 36 dispersals and three concrete runways.

Lissett opened in February 1943 and No. 158 Squadron RAF arrived from RAF Rufforth to be the resident squadron on 28 February. 158 Squadron was a heavy bomber squadron equipped with the four-engined Handley Page Halifax. The squadron flew the first operational mission on the night of 11/12 March 1943 when ten aircraft were flown to Stuttgart. One aircraft failed to return. The squadron carried out operations up to the end of the war from Lissett. Apart from a few weeks in early 1944 only 158 Squadron operated out of the station, which was unusual for an RAF base. Over the course of the 2 years 158 Squadron was stationed there they completed 250 missions, suffering the loss of 144 aircraft, either destroyed in combat or in accident. In addition, 851 of the squadron's airmen were lost in the war.

In May 1945 with the war at an end the squadron re-equipped with transport aircraft and was transferred to Transport Command. The squadron flew early-war four engine Short Stirling bombers before departing to RAF Stradishall in August 1945. With the departure of 158 Squadron the station was relegated to a care and maintenance status but by the end of the year the airfield was abandoned and the technical areas used for storage.

Based units

Current use

A memorial metal sculpture to 158 Squadron in the form of seven airmen representing the typical crew of a Halifax bomber, was erected on the base and dedicated to the memory of the 851 airmen who did not return from operations at the airfield. The monument is situated on the edge of the old airfield site on Gransmoor Road, Lissett.

References

Citations

Bibliography

External links

 Royal Air Force Station Lissett official history

Royal Air Force stations in Yorkshire
Royal Air Force stations of World War II in the United Kingdom
Wind farms in England